Per Gunnar Lager (3 September 1888 – 30 October 1960) was a Swedish rower who competed in the 1912 Summer Olympics and in the 1920 Summer Olympics.

In 1912 he was the strokeman of the Swedish boat Vaxholm which was eliminated in the first round of the coxed four competition. Eight years later he was the strokeman of the Swedish boat which was eliminated in the first round of the coxed four event. He rowed with his brother John.

References

External links
profile

1888 births
1960 deaths
Swedish male rowers
Olympic rowers of Sweden
Rowers at the 1912 Summer Olympics
Rowers at the 1920 Summer Olympics